The Wakhan Front is a 2015 French war thriller drama film directed by Clément Cogitore. It was screened in the International Critics' Week section at the 2015 Cannes Film Festival.

Cast
 Jérémie Renier as Antares Bonnassieu
 Swann Arlaud as Jérémie Lernowski
 Marc Robert as Jean Baptiste Frering
 Kévin Azaïs as William Denis
 Finnegan Oldfield as Patrick Mercier
 Clément Bresson as Étienne Baxer
 Sâm Mirhosseini as Khalil Khan
 Christophe Tek as Stéphane Tek
 Steve Tientcheu as Oscar Varennes
 Patrick Ligardes as Officer Armenet
 Hamid Reza Javdan as Sultan
 Michaël Vander-Meiren as Philippe Le Thieur
 Kamal Ait Taleb as Basile Delcourt

Production
The film was shot in the Atlas Mountains in Morocco.

Accolades

References

External links
 

2015 films
2015 directorial debut films
2015 drama films
2015 thriller drama films
Belgian thriller drama films
French thriller drama films
2010s French-language films
Films set in Afghanistan
Films with screenplays by Thomas Bidegain
French-language Belgian films
2010s French films